Frontiers in Medicine is a peer-reviewed open access medical journal covering all aspects of medicine in 18 sections. It was established in 2014 and is published by Frontiers Media. The editor-in-chief is Michel Goldman (Institute for Interdisciplinary Innovation in healthcare).

Abstracting and indexing
The journal is abstracted and indexed in PubMed and Scopus.
According to the Journal Citation Reports, the journal has a 2020 impact factor of 5.091.

References

External links
 

English-language journals
General medical journals
Open access journals
Publications established in 2014
Frontiers Media academic journals
Online-only journals